Luis Ángel Salmerón (born March 18, 1982, in Córdoba, Argentina) is a retired Argentine footballer, who played as a forward.

Career
Salmerón began playing for Ferro Carril Oeste in 2000. He spent several years playing lower league football with the likes of Deportivo Armenio, Atlanta, Tigre and Talleres de Córdoba before joining Primera División side Banfield in 2009.

He was a bit part player in the Apertura 2009 championship appearing in 4 games. On 13 December 2009 he celebrated with his teammates when Banfield won the Argentine championship for the first time in the history of the club.

In 2010, after a scoreless season in Banfield, Salmerón joined Independiente Rivadavia in the second division.

He moved to China and signed with Shanghai Shenhua in January 2011.

Honours
Banfield
Primera División Argentina: Apertura 2009

References

External links
  
 
 
 

1982 births
Living people
Footballers from Córdoba, Argentina
Argentine footballers
Argentine expatriate footballers
Association football forwards
Ferro Carril Oeste footballers
Club Atlético Atlanta footballers
Club Atlético Tigre footballers
Talleres de Córdoba footballers
Club Atlético Banfield footballers
Independiente Rivadavia footballers
Santiago Wanderers footballers
CSyD Tristán Suárez footballers
Club Atlético Los Andes footballers
Shanghai Shenhua F.C. players
Chinese Super League players
Chilean Primera División players
Argentine Primera División players
Primera Nacional players
Venezuelan Primera División players
Primera B Metropolitana players
Argentine expatriate sportspeople in Chile
Argentine expatriate sportspeople in China
Argentine expatriate sportspeople in Venezuela
Expatriate footballers in Chile
Expatriate footballers in China
Expatriate footballers in Venezuela